Russian Social-Democratic Union of Youth (RSDUY; Russian: Российский социал-демократический союз молодёжи, РСДСМ - Rossiyskiy Sotsial-Demokraticheskiy Soyuz Molodiozhi, RSDSM) is a Russian non-governmental organization founded in December 2000 with Mikhail Gorbachev's support as a youth branch of the Russian United Social Democratic Party and a member of International Union of Socialist Youth since 2004. The chairman has been Evgeniy Konovalov since 2006.

In 2007 members participated actively in the establishment of Union of Social Democrats.

On 19 March 2007 RSDUY refused to sign the Declaration of the Progressive Youth Forum, appealing to the fact that its authors actually call for revolution and trying to flirt with the nationalists.

On 25 November 2007 Evgeniy Konovalov has been detained by the riot police on the Palace Square in St.Petersburg. He and others arrested with him were released 45 minutes later.

On 9 August 2008 RSDUY and "Jusos-Rheinland-Pfalz" issued a joint resolution condemning the 2008 South Ossetia War.

In October, 2008 RSDUY together with Young socialists of Georgia declared their commitment to nonviolent methods of conflict resolution. On 6 December 2009 the process of cooperation between Young Socialist of Georgia and Russian Social Democratic Union of Youth fully supported during the conference of Young political leaders from Black Sea area.

On 24 June 2009 chairman of RSDUY Evgeniy Konovalov was dismissed from a Russian state company "Russian Post" for his political and public activity.

On Sunday, 25 July 2010 in St. Petersburg the group hosted the third congress of Russian Social-Democratic Union of Youth.

The group intends on becoming a mass political party in Russia.

On March, 2011 St.Petersburg authorities shut down antifascist film festival "Open Your Eyes!" (organized by RSDUY).

In 2009 the legal entity was liquidated. Until 2017, the organization operated without official registration, having ceased its activities.

References

External links

2000 establishments in Russia
2017 disestablishments in Russia
2021 establishments in Russia
Democratic socialism in Asia
Democratic socialism in Europe
Organizations based in Saint Petersburg
Organizations established in 2017
Organizations established in 2000
Organizations established in 2021
Social democratic organizations
Socialist organizations in Russia
Youth organizations based in Russia